Aurahi (Nepali: औरही ) is a Rural municipality in Siraha District in Madhesh Province of Nepal. It was formed in 2016 occupying current 5 sections (wards) from previous 5 former VDCs. It occupies an area of 35.87 km2 with a total population of 23,046.

References

External links
UN map of the municipalities of  Siraha District

Populated places in Siraha District
Rural municipalities of Nepal established in 2017
Rural municipalities in Madhesh Province